Kilian Patour (born 20 September 1982 in Saintes) is a French cyclist riding for UC Orléans.

Palmares
2000
 Junior National Road Race Champion
2003
 U23 National Road Race Champion
1st stage 4 Tour de la Manche
1st Brussels-Zepperen
2nd Paris–Troyes
2004
1st Grand Prix de la Ville de Nogent-sur-Oise
3rd U23 National Time Trial Championships
2009
1st stage 1 Tour of Qatar (TTT)

References

People from Saintes, Charente-Maritime
1982 births
Living people
French male cyclists
Sportspeople from Charente-Maritime
Cyclists from Nouvelle-Aquitaine